Russell M. Lay (January 22, 1907 – September 27, 1965) was an American football player.  

Lay was born in Williamston, Michigan in 1907, and attended Williamston High School.

He played college football for Michigan State College (later known as Michigan State University) from 1931 to 1933.

Lay signed with the Detroit Lions in June 1934. He appeared in two games for the Lions. In mid-October 1935, he joined the Cincinnati Reds, starting one game. In mid-November 1935, Lay was sold to the St. Louis Gunners. He started one game for the Gunners.

Lay served in the Navy during World War II. After the war, he operated a used car dealership in Lansing. He later sold his interest in the dealership and moved to Lake City, Michigan. He died in 1965 in Lake City.

References

1911 births
1965 deaths
Michigan State Spartans football players
Cincinnati Reds (NFL) players
St. Louis Gunners players
Detroit Lions players
Players of American football from Michigan
People from Williamston, Michigan